Double agents have appeared many times in fiction. Note: This list also includes reverse agents, triple agents, quadruple agents.

Movies 
 Riley Hicks (Fast and Furious 6)
 Captain Trudy Chacon (Avatar)
 Bridget von Hammersmark (Inglourious Basterds)
 Dickie Randall (Night Train to Munich)
 Carl Rader (Santa Fe Trail)
 Louis Renault (Casablanca)
 Major Dalby (The Ipcress File)
 Secret Service Agent Gibbs (Air Force One)
 Det. Wuertz (The Dark Knight)
 Det. Ramirez (The Dark Knight)
 Dorian Gray (The League of Extraordinary Gentlemen)
 Hawley Griffin (The League of Extraordinary Gentlemen)
 Paulie Gatto (The Godfather)
 Unger (The Longest Yard)
 Bill Haydon (Portrayed by Colin Firth) (Tinker Tailor Soldier Spy)
 Alec Trevelyan (GoldenEye)
 Diego (Ice Age)
 Miranda Frost (Die Another Day)
 George "Mac" MicHale (Indiana Jones and the Kingdom of the Crystal Skull) (quadruple agent)
 Other Father - (Coraline)
 Agent 23 (Get Smart)
 Lorraine Broughton (Atomic Blonde) (triple agent)

TV series 
 Kaldur/Aqualad (Young Justice) (double agent)
 Jack Bristow (Alias)
 Sydney Bristow (Alias)
 Nicholas Brody (Homeland)
 Carrie Mathison (Homeland)
 Rachel Gibson (Alias)
 Ari Haswari (NCIS)
 Connie James (Spooks)
 Marian (Robin Hood (2006 TV series))
 Nina Myers (24)
 Gael Ortega (24) (triple agent)
 Lauren Reed (Alias)
 Scaphandra (Æon Flux) (double agent)
 Alex Krycek (The X-Files) (Mystery Man)
 Grant Ward (Agents of S.H.I.E.L.D.) (HYDRA Operative)
 Punch-Counterpunch, in The Transformers

Books 
 Answer (comics)
 Ash  (Snakehead)
 Captain America
 Jason Bourne (character)
 Vesper Lynd (Casino Royale)
 Gajeel Redfox/Gazille Reitfox (Fairy Tail)
 Severus Snape (Harry Potter)
 Bill Haydon (Tinker, Tailor, Soldier, Spy)
 Black Widow (Comics)
 Howard W. Campbell (Mother Night)

Video games 
 Paul Denton (Deus Ex)
 Judith Mossman (Half-Life 2) (triple agent)
 Revolver Ocelot (Metal Gear) (triple agent)
 Albert Wesker (Resident Evil)
 Ada Wong (Resident Evil)
 Iron Bull (Dragon Age: Inquisition)

To be determined 

 Jason Chance (Syphon Filter 2)
 Gary Johnston (Team America: World Police)
 Shuichi Akai (Case Closed)
 Æon Flux (possibly triple agent)
 Ari Haswari
 Ariel (Robotech)
 Director D  (Poptropica: Spy Island)
 Walter C. Dornez (Hellsing) (double, possibly triple agent)
 Double Trouble (She-Ra)
 Tom Foss
 Colby Granger
 Bill Haydon
 Pete Henderson (The Cardinal of the Kremlin)
 Ryoji Kaji (Neon Genesis Evangelion) (triple agent)
 Kamen Rider ZX
 Killowat
 William Lennox (Black)
 Lau Kin Ming (劉健明) (Infernal Affairs)
 Rena Mizunashi (Case Closed)
 Sera (Robotech character)
 Juni Swan
 Mike Toreno (Grand Theft Auto: San Andreas)
 Quinlan Vos
 Chan Wing Yan (陳永仁) (Infernal Affairs)
 Col. Robert Makepeace (Stargate SG-1)
 Col. Harry Maybourne (Stargate SG-1)
 Shockwave (Transformers Animated)
 Nasir (Fire Emblem: Path of Radiance)
 Revolver Ocelot (Metal Gear Solid / Metal Gear Solid 2: Sons of Liberty / Metal Gear Solid 3: Snake Eater / Metal Gear Solid 4: Guns of the Patriots) (Depending on the time period, double, triple, or quadruple agent)
 Roodaka (Bionicle)
 Rose/Thorn (American Dragon: Jake Long)
 Scorpius (Farscape) (triple agent)
 John Simon (Demonology 101)
 Col. Frank Simmons (Stargate SG-1)
 Arvin Sloane (Alias)
 Major John Smith (Where Eagles Dare) (triple agent)
 Spider-Woman (New Avengers) (triple agent)
 Morgan Sullivan (Cypher) (triple agent)
 Terra (Teen Titans)
 Nefertari Vivi (One Piece)
 Lucy Stillman (Assassin's Creed) (triple agent)
 Kabuto Yakushi (Naruto)
 Itachi Uchiha (Naruto) (Depending on the time period triple, or quadruple agent)
 Sailors Uranus and Neptune (Sailor Moon Stars)
 Billy Costigan (The Departed)
 James Bond (007)
 Yuan Tales of Symphonia (one of Cruxis' 4 Seraphim who eventually betrays Cruxis)
 Orson (Fire Emblem: The Sacred Stones)]
 Sam Fisher (Splinter Cell: Double Agent)
 General Skarr (Underfist)
 in the Choose Your Own Adventure series:
 Haven Nightshade (Escape)
 Raoul (Sabotage)
 The Spy from Team Fortress 2 (stated to be a "double-reverse quadruple agent")
 Evelyn Salt from Salt
 Diana Burnwood from Hitman: Blood Money
 Cipher Nine (Star Wars: The Old Republic) (Double and later triple agent)
 Raven (Tales of Vesperia) (triple agent)
 Seska (Star Trek: Voyager)
 Wei Shen (Sleeping Dogs)
 Thomas Pendrew (Sleeping Dogs) (Possible double agent)
 Irene Adler (Sherlock Holmes (2009 film)) (Possible triple agent)

 Riley Hicks (Fast & Furious 6)
 John Garrett and Grant Ward (Agents of S.H.I.E.L.D.) are HYDRA operatives.
 Remy Marathe (Infinite Jest) (Quadruple agent)
 Gin Ichimaru (Bleach)
 Noel Takao (Kaitou Sentai Lupinranger VS Keisatsu Sentai Patranger)

See also

Spies, List of fictional